The sixteenth season of the American police procedural drama NCIS originally aired from September 25, 2018, through May 21, 2019, at the same time slot as in the previous seasons, Tuesdays at 8:00 p.m. and contained 24 episodes.

NCIS revolves around a fictional team of special agents from the Naval Criminal Investigative Service, which conducts criminal investigations involving the U.S. Navy and Marine Corps.

Season 16 revolves around two major storylines after the premiere concludes the plot from the previous season's finale: a season-long arc involving a vigilante justice ring, and the reveal that Ziva David is actually alive halfway through the season. The latter fact is confirmed by her physical appearance in the final moments of the finale, "Daughters". This season takes on a darker undertone for Gibbs as he reveals to his team that he killed the man responsible for his wife Shannon and daughter Kelly's deaths.

Cast

Main
 Mark Harmon as Leroy Jethro Gibbs, NCIS Supervisory Special Agent (SSA) of the Major Case Response Team (MCRT) assigned to Washington's Navy Yard
 Sean Murray as Timothy McGee, NCIS Senior Special Agent, second in command of MCRT
 Wilmer Valderrama as Nick Torres, NCIS Special Agent
 Emily Wickersham as Eleanor "Ellie" Bishop, NCIS Special Agent
 Maria Bello as Dr. Jacqueline "Jack" Sloane, NCIS Senior Resident Agent and Operational Psychologist
 Brian Dietzen as Dr. Jimmy Palmer, Assistant Medical Examiner for NCIS (episodes 1–17), Chief Medical Examiner for NCIS (episodes 17-24) 
 Diona Reasonover as Kasie Hines, Forensic Specialist for NCIS
 Rocky Carroll as Leon Vance, NCIS Director
 David McCallum as Dr. Donald "Ducky" Mallard, Chief Medical Examiner for NCIS (episodes 1–17), NCIS Historian (episodes 17-24)

Recurring
 Joe Spano as Tobias Fornell, Private Detective and former FBI Senior Special Agent
 Robert Wagner as Anthony DiNozzo, Sr., father of former NCIS Special Agent Anthony DiNozzo
 Scott William Winters as Westley Clark, CIA Agent
 Margo Harshman as Delilah Fielding-McGee, DoD Intelligence Analyst and McGee's wife
 Laura San Giacomo as Dr. Grace Confalone, psychotherapist
 Don Lake as Phillip Brooks, Navy Captain
 Larry Miller as Ed Slater, Jimmy Palmer's father-in-law
 Melinda McGraw as Diane Sterling, deceased IRS Special Agent and Gibbs' and Fornell's ex-wife
 Pej Vahdat as Nigel Hakim, British Humanitarian and terrorist
 Mitch Pileggi as Wynn Crawford, U.S. Secretary of Defense
 Kent Shocknek as Guy Ross, ZNN news anchor
 Mike Farrell as Judge Miles Deakin
 Elayn J. Taylor as Odette Malone, owner of Ziva's private office
 Juliette Angelo as Emily Fornell, Tobias Fornell’s daughter
 Naomi Grace as Kayla Vance, Leon Vance's daughter
 Dionne Gipson as Mallory Madden, CIA Agent and Leon Vance's ex-girlfriend
 Kate Hamilton as Faith Tolliver, Jack Sloane's biological daughter

Special guest star
 Cote de Pablo as Ziva David, former Mossad Officer and former NCIS Special Agent

Guest
 Erin Cummings as Marine Major Ellen Wallace, Gibbs's ex-fiancée
 Charles Robinson as Ray Jennings, former Marine Lance Corporal
 Fred Dryer as Thomas Fletcher, retired Marine Master Sergeant
 Dabney Coleman as Army Corporal John Sydney
 Dee Wallace as Claire Hall
 Michele Boyd as Emily Ross
 Charles Tyler Kinder as young Timothy McGee
 Ashley Liao as Hayley
 Megan Gallagher as Jennifer Leo, Under Secretary of the Navy

Episodes

Ratings

References

2018 American television seasons
2019 American television seasons
NCIS 16